Oleksandr Mykhailovych Feshchenko (born 2 January 1985) is a Ukrainian football defender currently playing for Moldovan National Division club FC Tiraspol.

Club history
Oleksandr Feshchenko began his football career in RVUFC in Kyiv. He signed with Iskra-Stal during 2009 summer transfer window.

Career statistics

References

External links
 Profile – Moldova Sport
  Profile on the FFU website
  Profile Official Iskra-Stal site

1985 births
Living people
Ukrainian footballers
FC Kremin Kremenchuk players
Ukrainian expatriate footballers
Expatriate footballers in Moldova
FC Tiraspol players
Association football defenders